Moira Murić is a Bosnian football forward currently playing for Rudar Škale in Slovenia's SŽNL. She previously played for Olimpija Ljubljana and ŽNK Senožeti.

She made her official debut for the Bosnian national team in November 2011, in the 2013 European Championship qualifiers. She scored her first goal three months later in a 2–3 win on Greece.

References

1985 births
Living people
Bosnia and Herzegovina expatriate women's footballers
Expatriate women's footballers in Slovenia
Women's association football forwards
Bosnia and Herzegovina women's international footballers
ŽNK Olimpija Ljubljana players
Bosnia and Herzegovina women's footballers